Claude Couffon (May 4, 1926 – December 18, 2013) was a prolific Spanish to French translator, university professor, French  poet, and an expert in Spanish and Latin American literature.

Biography
He taught Spanish and Latin American literature at Le Sorbonne, Paris, until he retired in 1991.

Accolades
Claude Couffon was a member of the Cuban Language Academy.

Works

Poetry books
 Le Temps d’une ombre ou d’une image, 1973
 Célébrations, 1979
 Corps automnal, Caractères, 1981
https://www.google.com/opengallery/manage/items/20773232?hl=en&q=claude%20couffon&itemIds=hwHJTX1aPNZ34g
 Absent Présent, Caractères, 1983
 À l’ombre de ce corps, 1988
 Intimité, 2008

Essays and Anthologies
 À Caen avec les Canadiens, Rouff (Paris), 1949.
 Les Japonais à genoux, Rouff (Paris), 1949.
 À Grenade sur les pas de Garcia Lorca, Seghers, 1962.
 Nicolas Guillen, coll. "Poètes d'aujourd'hui", Seghers, 1964.
 L'Espagne, coll. "Monde et voyage", Larousse, 1964.
 Rafael Alberti, coll. "Poètes d'aujourd'hui", Seghers, 1965.
 Histoires et légendes de l'Espagne mystérieuse, Tchou, 1968.
 Contes populaires espagnols, Tchou, 1968.
 Miguel Angel Asturias, coll. "Poètes d'aujourd'hui", Seghers, 1970.
 René Depestre, coll. "Poètes d'aujourd'hui", Seghers, 1986.
 Poésie dominicaine, Patino, 1996 .
 Poésie cubaine du XXe siècle, Patino, 1997.
 Poésie hondurienne du XXe siècle, édition bilingue, Patino, 1997.
 Histoires étranges et fantastiques d'Amérique latine, coll. "Suites", Métailié, 1998.
 Poésie mexicaine du XXe siècle, édition bilingue, Patino, 2004.
 Un demi-siècle de poésie - les poètes de Cartactères, par Claude Couffon et Nicole Gdalia, Caractères, 2004.
 Poètes de Chiapas, bilingue, Caractères, 2009.

Spanish to French Translations
Rafael Alberti
 À la peinture, prologue et traduction de Claude Couffon. Dessins de Rafael Alberti. Le Passeur, Nantes, 2001.

Miguel Angel Asturias
 Poèmes indiens, préface de Claude Couffon, trad. de Claude Couffon et René-L..-F. Durand, coll. "Poésie/Gallimard", 1990

Silvia Eugenia Castillero
 Zooliloques, Indigo

Camilo José Cela
 San Camiolo 1936, trad. de Claude Bourguignon et Claude Couffon
 Office des ténèbres 5, trad. de Claude Bourguignon et Claude Couffon, 1978

Blas de Otero
 Je demande la paix et la parole: Pido la paz y la palabra, poèmes traduits de l'espagnol par Claude Couffon
Joaquin Balaguer
 Colón precursor literario: traduits de l'espagnol par Claude Couffon

Lourdes Espinola
 Les mots du corps, bilingue, Indigo

Gabriel García Márquez
 L'Automne du patriarche, Grasset, 1977.
 Chronique d'une mort annoncée, Grasset, 1981
 La Mala Hora, Grasset, 1986

Nicolas Guillen
 Le Chant de Cuba - Poèmes 1930-1972,

Jorge Icaza
 L'Homme de Quito, Albin Michel, 1993

Luis Mizon
 Poèmes du sud et autres poèmes, bilingue, trad. par Roger Caillois et Claude Couffon, Gallimard, 1982
 Le songe du figuier en flamme, poèmes traduits par Claude Couffon, éd. Folle Avoine, 1999
 Jardin des ruines, poèmes traduits par Claude Couffon, éd. Obsidiane, 1992
 Le Manuscrit du Minotaure, texte traduit par Claude Couffon, éd. Brandes, 1992
 La Mort de l'Inca, roman, traduit par Claude Couffon, éd. Le Seuil, 1992
 Voyages et retour, poèmes traduits par Claude Couffon, éd. Obsidiane, 1989
 Noces, texte traduit par Claude Couffon, éd. Brandes, 1988
 Province perdue, éd. Cahiers de Royaumont, 1988
 Terre brûlée, poèmes traduits par Claude Couffon, éd. Le Calligraphe, 1984

Myriam Montoya
 Fugues, bilingues, coll. "Poètes des cinq continents", L'Harmattan, 1997

Pablo Neruda
 Chant général  
 J'avoue que j'ai vécu, Gallimard, 1975

Milagros Palma
 Le Pacte, trad. de Pierre Rubira et Claude Couffon, Indigo

Ernesto Sábato
 L'écrivain et la catastrophe, Seuil, 1986

Manuel Scorza
 Roulements de tambours pour Rancas'', Grasset, 1972

References

1926 births
2013 deaths
French poets
Academic staff of the University of Paris
20th-century French translators